, originally known as Planet-A, was an unmanned space probe developed by the Institute of Space and Astronautical Science (now part of the Japanese Aerospace Exploration Agency, or JAXA).

It constituted a part of the Halley Armada together with Sakigake, the Soviet Vega probes, the ESA Giotto and the NASA International Cometary Explorer, to explore Halley's Comet during its 1986 sojourn through the inner solar system.

Spacecraft
Suisei was identical in construction and shape to Sakigake, but carried a different payload: a CCD UV imaging system and a solar wind instrument.

The main objective of the mission was to take UV images of the hydrogen corona for about 30 days before and after Comet Halley's descending crossing of the ecliptic plane. Solar wind parameters were measured for a much longer time period.

The spacecraft is spin-stabilized at two different rates (5 and 0.2 rpm). Hydrazine thrusters are used for attitude and velocity control; star and sun sensors are for attitude control; and a mechanically despun off-set parabolic dish is used for long range communication.

Launch
Suisei was launched on August 18, 1985 by M-3SII launch vehicle from Kagoshima Space Center on M-3SII-2 mission. It was sent on an intercept course with Comet Halley, after which it would remain in a heliocentric orbit for later use as long as it was viable.

Halley encounter
Suisei began UV observations in November 1985, generating up to 6 images/day.

The spacecraft encountered Comet Halley at 151,000 km on sunward side during March 8, 1986, suffering only 2 dust impacts.

Earth flyby
Fifteen burns of Suiseis 3 N motors during the period of April 5–10, 1987, yielded a 65 m/s velocity increase for a 60,000 km Earth gravity assist swingby on August 20, 1992, although the craft was then lost behind the Sun for the summer.

The hydrazine fuel was depleted on February 22, 1991.  Preliminary tracking indicated a 900,000-km flyby had been achieved.

Other planned encounters
ISAS had decided during 1987 to guide Suisei to a November 24, 1998, encounter with 21P/Giacobini-Zinner, but due to depletion of the hydrazine, this, as well as plans to fly within several million kilometers of Comet 55P/Tempel-Tuttle on February 28, 1998, were cancelled.

References

External links

 Suisei
 Suisei Mission Profile by NASA's Solar System Exploration
 Halley's Comet Flyby
 Suisei Mission Comet Halley Data Archive at the NASA Planetary Data System, Small Bodies Node

Japanese space probes
Missions to Halley's Comet
Satellites orbiting the Sun
1985 in spaceflight
Derelict space probes
Spacecraft launched in 1985
Japanese inventions